Kamel Djahmoune (born 16 June 1961) is an Algerian footballer. He played in six matches for the Algeria national football team in 1986 and 1988. He was also named in Algeria's squad for the 1988 African Cup of Nations tournament.

References

External links
 

1961 births
Living people
Algerian footballers
Algeria international footballers
1988 African Cup of Nations players
People from Blida Province
Association football forwards
21st-century Algerian people
USM Blida players
MC Alger players
CR Belouizdad players
Olympique de Médéa players
USMM Hadjout players